Kollidam block is a revenue block in the Sirkazhi taluk of Mayiladuthurai district, Tamil Nadu, India. There are a total of 38 panchayat villages in this block. It is located 32 KM towards North from District head quarters Mayiladuthurai. It is a Block head quarter.

References 
 

Revenue blocks of Mayiladuthurai district